The vice chief of staff of the Army (VCSA) is the principal deputy to the chief of staff of the Army, and is the second-highest-ranking officer on active duty in the Department of the Army.

The vice chief of staff generally handles the day-to-day administration of the Army Staff, freeing the chief of staff to attend to the interservice responsibilities of the Joint Chiefs of Staff. By statute, the vice chief of staff is appointed as a four-star general in the United States Army while so serving.

The incumbent vice chief of staff of the Army, since August 5, 2022, is General Randy A. George.

Role

The senior leadership of the U.S. Department of the Army consists of two civilians, the secretary of the Army and the under secretary of the Army, as well as two commissioned officers, the Army Chief of Staff and the Army Vice Chief of Staff.

Under the supervision and direction of the secretary of the Army (who in turn is under the authority, direction and control of the secretary of defense) the vice chief of staff assists the chief of staff on missions and functions related to their duties. The vice chief of staff also assists the chief of staff in the management/oversight of U.S. Army installations and facilities.

Furthermore, the vice chief of staff may also represent the Army at the Office of the Secretary of Defense/Joint Staff level in areas relating to the chief of staff's responsibility and U.S. Army capabilities, requirements, policy, plans, and programs. The vice chief of staff is the designated Army representative to the Joint Requirements Oversight Council (JROC).

If the chief of staff is incapacitated or otherwise relieved of duty, the vice chief of staff serves as the acting chief of staff. If both the chief of staff and the vice chief of staff were to be incapacitated, the senior-most general on the Army Staff would become the acting chief of staff of the Army until someone else is appointed.

Appointment
The vice chief of staff of the Army is appointed by the president, by and with the advice and consent of the Senate, from among the general officers of the Army.

Unlike the chief of staff of the Army, there is no fixed term nor term limit to the position of the vice chief of staff, although most of those appointed to the office have typically served for two or three year tenures.

List of Vice Chiefs of Staff of the Army

Timeline

See also
Sergeant Major of the Army
 Under Secretary of the Army
Assistant Commandant of the Marine Corps (USMC counterpart)
 Vice Chief of Naval Operations (USN counterpart)
Vice Chief of Staff of the Air Force (USAF counterpart)
 Vice Chief of Space Operations (USSF counterpart)
 Vice Commandant of the Coast Guard (USCG counterpart)

References

External links
 Official Website

 
United States Army organization
Vice chiefs of staff